Dactyladenia is a genus of plants in the family Chrysobalanaceae. They are distributed in western and central Africa, from Liberia to Angola. There are about 31 species.

The genus was first described by Friedrich Welwitsch in his work Apontamentos Fito-geograficos sobre a Flora da Provincia de Angola na Africa Equinocial (1859).

Species

References

 
Chrysobalanaceae genera
Flora of Africa